Barry John (born 1944) is a British-born, Indian theatre director and teacher. He was the Founder-Director of 'Theatre Action Group' (TAG) (1973), one of the early theatre groups based in Delhi.

In 1997, he launched Imago Media Company, and also started Imago Acting School in Delhi, both of which moved to Mumbai in March 2007. The school also got him recognition, as some of the alumni went on to become Bollywood actors, including Shahrukh Khan, Manoj Bajpai, Sushant Singh Rajput, Dulquer Salman Samir Soni and Shiney Ahuja, as well as Hollywood actors including Freida Pinto and one of the top 10 US media companies CEO Samir Arora. He has been based in India since 1969. After moving to Mumbai his acting school was opened in Mumbai as 'The Barry John Acting Studio', situated in Andheri.

He was awarded the 1993 Sangeet Natak Akademi Award for Theatre Direction by Sangeet Natak Akademi, India's National Academy for Music, Dance and Theatre, and also the Sahitya Kala Parishad Award.

Early life and education
Barry John was born in 1944, in the industrial city of Coventry, Warwickshire (now in the West Midlands), England. His father, an engineer by profession, joined the navy during the World War II and his mother was a home-maker, and his younger sister was Christine.

By the age of 12, he had started selling newspapers, and pursued theatre in the evenings. At 15, his father fixed up a job for him at the factory where he worked. After finishing his schooling, he moved to London, but unable to find place in acting schools, he joined Leeds University at Leeds, West Yorkshire. There he trained to become a theatre teacher, for three years under John Hutchson, the head of department.

Career

Deeply influenced by India, and its culture, during the hippie era, he even delved into the Upanishads. Then in 1968, Pandit Ravi Shankar staged a concert at the Coventry Cathedral, a few days later, he saw an ad in the newspapers for a teaching job in India, to which he applied. Thus at age of 22 he landed in Bangalore, where he stayed for the next two years, teaching English during the day at Regional Institute of English on Cunningham Road, and doing radio programmes. Evenings were for amateur theatre, with Bangalore Amateur Dramatics Society and the Bangalore Little Theatre. After arriving in Delhi in 1970, he joined the 'Yatrik' theatre group, staying at the YMCA hostel and working as a freelance teacher in schools and colleges.

In 1973, he founded the Theatre Action Group (TAG), with Siddharth Basu, Roshan Seth, Lilette Dubey, Mira Nair, Ravi Dubey, Manohar Singh, Khalid Tyabji, Pamela Rooks, Surekha Sikri and Pankaj Kapoor; the group performed various forms of drama till 1977, when he joined as a faculty of the National School of Drama, Delhi (1977–80), and later became the Founder-Director of the NSD's Theatre in Education Company (TIE)(1989). He has been conducting theatre workshops ever since and in 1997, opened the 'Imago Acting School' in Delhi.

He also appeared in a few films, like Satyajit Ray's Shatranj Ke Khilari (The Chess Players) (1977), Richard Attenborough's Gandhi (1982), Massey Sahib (1985). He also acted in several of his own productions, as well as that of other directors, including Roysten Abel's Othello a Play in Black and White. In 2010, he appeared in Tere Bin Laden in the role of a United States security general.

In 2007, he moved to Mumbai, where his acting school was opened as 'Barry John Acting Studio', in the same year, he also wrote a book "Playing for Real", published by Macmillan, a chronicle of 178 drama exercises for children, and co-authored by Rajan Chawla and Cathy Yogin, students of his Imago Theatre in Education Company.

Filmography

Awards
 1993: Sangeet Natak Akademi Award: Theatre Direction.

References
 14 ^http://photogallery.indiatimes.com/pictures-of-actor-rishabh-jain-in-his-upcoming-movie-lethal-trip/articleshow/96179701.cms

External links
 
 
 

Indian theatre directors
Indian male stage actors
Drama teachers
Indian male film actors
1944 births
Living people
People from Coventry
Alumni of the University of Leeds
Academic staff of the National School of Drama
Male actors in Hindi cinema
British emigrants to India
Recipients of the Sangeet Natak Akademi Award